Debendra Roy (born 18 June 1971) is an Indian former cricketer. He played one first-class match for Bengal in 1992/93.

See also
 List of Bengal cricketers

References

External links
 

1971 births
Living people
Indian cricketers
Bengal cricketers
Cricketers from Kolkata